The 2022 Lexus Grand Prix of Mid-Ohio was a sports car race held at Mid-Ohio Sports Car Course near Lexington, Ohio on May 15, 2022. It was the fifth round of the 2022 IMSA SportsCar Championship and the third round of the 2022 WeatherTech Sprint Cup. Wayne Taylor Racing's #10 car piloted by Ricky Taylor and Filipe Albuquerque collected their second victory of the season.

Background

Entries

A total of 31 cars took part in the event, split across four classes. 6 were entered in DPi, 6 in LMP2, 8 in LMP3, and 11 in GTD.

Qualifying

Qualifying results

Race

Results 

References

External links

Lexus Grand Prix of Mid-Ohio
Lexus Grand Prix of Mid-Ohio
2022 WeatherTech SportsCar Championship season